Tremayne Aubrey Allen is a former American football tight end in the National Football League who played for the Chicago Bears. He played college football for the Florida Gators. He also played in the XFL for the Los Angeles Xtreme.

References

1974 births
Living people
American football tight ends
Chicago Bears players
Los Angeles Xtreme players
Florida Gators football players